Jason Michael Peter (born September 13, 1974) is a former American college and professional football player who was a defensive end in the National Football League (NFL) for four seasons. Peter was a college football All-American at the University of Nebraska. He was taken in the first round by the Carolina Panthers in the 1998 NFL Draft.

Early years
Peter grew up in the Locust neighborhood of Middletown Township, New Jersey. He played high school football at Middletown High School South in Middletown Township and at Milford Academy in Connecticut.

College career
Peter attended the University of Nebraska, and played for the Nebraska Cornhuskers football team from 1994 to 1997. As a senior in 1997, he was recognized as a consensus first-team All-American.

Collegiate statistics

Professional career
His career was shortened by a recurring and chronic neck stinger that forced him to retire after the 2001 season.

Post-playing career
After ending his professional playing career, Peter was a defensive line coach at Edison High School in Huntington Beach, California, and then defensive line coach at Harvard-Westlake School in North Hollywood, California.

Peter was the co-host of The Spread, a local sports talk radio show on ESPN 1480 in Lincoln, Nebraska. He co-hosted the show with Jeff Wilkerson. The show was canceled in November 2009 when the station changed formats. He was also the co-host of a morning radio on 1620 the zone in Omaha, Nebraska, called "Sharp and Peter in the Morning", which aired from 7:00 AM to 11:00 AM Monday thru Friday.

Peter's book, Hero of the Underground: My Journey Down To Heroin & Back was published by St. Martin's Press. The memoir chronicles Peter's addiction to heroin and cocaine, along with pain relievers and alcohol.

Personal life
Peter is the middle child of three sons and one daughter. His younger brother, Damian, signed a letter of intent to play football for the University of Notre Dame but never played a down due to a swimming pool accident, which he came out of nearly paralyzed. Peter's older brother, Christian Peter, also played in the NFL.

References

1974 births
Living people
All-American college football players
American football defensive ends
American radio personalities
Carolina Panthers players
High school football coaches in California
Milford Academy alumni
Middletown High School South alumni
Nebraska Cornhuskers football players
People from Middletown Township, New Jersey
Players of American football from New Jersey
Sportspeople from Monmouth County, New Jersey